Chang Chia-gwe (born 23 May 1915, date of death unknown) was a Chinese athlete. He competed in the men's long jump and the men's triple jump at the 1936 Summer Olympics. He was from Wuxi, Jiangsu, and in 1933 competed at the 3rd Jiangsu Provincial Athletics Competition in Zhenjiang, where he won gold in the men's long jump and triple jump with distances of 6.69 m and 13.05 m respectively.

References

1915 births
Year of death missing
Athletes (track and field) at the 1936 Summer Olympics
Chinese male long jumpers
Chinese male triple jumpers
Olympic athletes of China
Athletes from Jiangsu
Sportspeople from Wuxi
20th-century Chinese people